Mark Wall may refer to:
Mark Wall (footballer) (born 1963), Australian rules footballer
Mark Wall (politician) (born 1970), Irish Labour Party senator
Sir Mark Wall (judge), British High Court judge

See also
 Marc M. Wall (born 1954), American diplomat